Louis de Gonzague Belley,  (February 3, 1863 – July 9, 1930) was a Canadian politician.

Born in St-Alexis de la Grande Baie, Canada East, he was a lawyer before being acclaimed at the age of 29 to the House of Commons of Canada for the Quebec riding of Chicoutimi—Saguenay in an 1892 by-election. A Conservative, he was defeated in the 1896 election. In September 1921, he was appointed Postmaster General in the cabinet of Arthur Meighen. He was defeated in the 1921 federal election.

He died at his home in Quebec City on July 9, 1930.

References

External links

1863 births
1930 deaths
Conservative Party of Canada (1867–1942) MPs
Members of the House of Commons of Canada from Quebec
Members of the King's Privy Council for Canada
Postmasters General of Canada
Canadian King's Counsel